Sheldon S. Leffler (born September 6, 1942) is an American politician who served in the New York City Council from 1978 to 2001. Leffler was instrumental in establishing the residential and commercial recycling program in New York City in 1989. According to Eric Goldstein (NRDC expert blogger), "Sheldon Leffler, who was Chairman of the Council’s Environmental Protection Committee and the bill’s leading shepherd, pronounced the statute “a strong beginning … not the end.”  City Council Majority Leader Peter F. Vallone, proclaimed the new law to be “one of the most significant pieces of legislation in the history of the city.” (https://www.nrdc.org/experts/eric-goldstein/new-york-citys-history-making-recycling-law-turns-25-years-old-part-i)

References

1942 births
Living people
New York City Council members
New York (state) Democrats
Recycling in New York City